The Carducci String Quartet consist of Matthew Denton (violin), Michelle Fleming (violin), Eoin Schmidt-Martin, (viola), and Emma Denton (cello).

The ensemble first played in 1997, and have won international competitions including Concert Artists Guild International Competition USA 2007  and First Prize at Finland's Kuhmo International Chamber Music Competition 2004.

Their work covers a broad range, new works, music with folk origins, classic quartets such as Haydn and they have built a reputation for complete Shostakovich cycles.

In 2016, they won the Royal Philharmonic Society Award for their Shostakovich Quartets.

They are published on Carducci Classics, and on Naxos.

They have received positive reviews of their performances from The Times and The Guardian.

References

British string quartets
Musical groups established in 1997
1997 establishments in the United Kingdom